Nomophilini is a tribe of the species-rich subfamily Spilomelinae in the pyraloid moth family Crambidae. The tribe was erected by Vladimir Ivanovitsch Kuznetzov and Alexandr A. Stekolnikov in 1979.

The tribe currently comprises the following 24 genera, altogether containing 358 species:
Arnia Guenée, 1849
Ategumia Amsel, 1956
Bocchoris Moore, 1885
Crocidocnemis Warren, 1889 (= Somatania Möschler, 1890, Somatamia Kimball, 1965)
Desmia Westwood, 1832 (= Aediodes Guenée, 1854, Arna Walker, 1856, Hyalitis Guenée, 1854)
Diacme Warren, 1892
Diasemia Hübner, 1825 (= Goniogramma Mann, 1854, Prodelia Doubleday, 1849)
Diasemiodes Munroe, 1957
Diasemiopsis Munroe, 1957 (= Diasemopsis Leraut, 1997)
Diathrausta Lederer, 1863 (= Tripodaula Meyrick, 1933, Triplodaula Munroe, 1956)
Epipagis Hübner, 1825 (= Epipages Hampson, 1918, Stenophyes Lederer, 1863)
Mecyna Doubleday, 1849
Mimophobetron Munroe, 1950
Mimorista Warren, 1890
Niphograpta Warren, 1892
Nomophila Hübner, 1825 (= Macronomeutis Meyrick, 1936, Stenopteryx Duponchel, 1845)
Nothomastix Warren, 1890
Parapilocrocis Munroe, 1967
Pardomima Warren, 1890 (= Pachyparda E. L. Martin, 1955)
Perisyntrocha Meyrick, 1894
Pessocosma Meyrick, 1884
Samea Guenée, 1854 (= Pterygisus Butler, 1886, Isopteryx Guenée, 1854)
Sameodes Snellen, 1880
Syngamia Guenée, 1854 (= Ochlia Hübner, 1823)

References

Spilomelinae
Moth tribes